Bruceia pulverina is a moth of the family Erebidae. It was described by Berthold Neumögen in 1893.

References

Lithosiini
Moths described in 1893
Moths of North America